Mir 'Ali Mardan Shah, Nuzrat ol-Molk (1830 – 1901) was head of the Timurid dynasty in 19th-century Persia.

Nuzrat ol-Mulk was the eldest son of Amir Qelich Khan of Teymuri. Nuzrat ol-Mulk married Ashraf us-Sultana Qajar. 

Issue includes Amirteymour Kalali and Nosrat Saltaneh.

See also
Amirteymour Kalali
Maryam Kalali
Asadollah Alam
Mostowfi ol-Mamalek
Saad ad-Daula
Abdol Majid Mirza

Sources
Agheli, Bagher, Teymourtash Dar Sahneye-h Siasate-h Iran ("Teimurtash in the Political Arena of Iran") (Javeed: Tehran, 1371).
Ansari, Ali, Modern Iran Since 1921: The Pahlavis and After (Longman: London, 2003) .
'Alí Rizā Awsatí (عليرضا اوسطى), Iran in the Past Three Centuries (Irān dar Se Qarn-e Goz̲ashteh - ايران در سه قرن گذشته), Volumes 1 and 
Sheikholeslami, Javad, So-oud va Sog-out-e Teymourtash ("The Rise and Fall of Teymourtash") (Tous: Tehran, 1379) .

External links
 https://commons.wikimedia.org/wiki/File:Mir_ali_mardan_shah_nosrat-al_molk.jpg

1830 births
1901 deaths
People of Qajar Iran